Zhang Jiewen (born 4 January 1981) is a Chinese former badminton player.

Career 
One of China's most successful women's doubles specialists, Zhang has won some thirty international titles, the vast majority of them in partnership with Yang Wei, during the first decade of the 21st century. They have shared world dominance almost equally with their compatriot adversaries Gao Ling and Huang Sui. One or the other pair has captured all of the BWF World Championships held since 2000, with Zhang and Yang winning in both 2005 and 2007 by defeating Gao and Huang in the finals. Zhang and Yang also emerged victorious at the 2004 Olympics in Athens by besting their rivals in a closely contested gold medal match. Conversely, Gao and Huang had the upper hand in three finals (2003), 2004, 2006) at the venerable All-England Championships. This tourney has been something of an anomaly for Zhang as she has reached the women's doubles final there six times (four with Yang and twice, earlier, with Wei Yili) without winning.

In 2008 Zhang helped China secure its sixth consecutive Uber Cup (women's world team championship), and won the Swiss, Thailand, and Malaysia Open women's doubles titles with Yang. At the Beijing Olympics where they were top seeded, however, Zhang and Yang were upset in the quarterfinals by Japan's Miyuki Maeda and Satoko Suetsuna. The event was eventually won by another, younger Chinese pair, Du Jing and Yu Yang, perhaps marking a changing of the guard in the Chinese dynasty.

Zhang Jiewen decided to quit competitive badminton after the 2008 Summer Olympics, when she married former Malaysian men's badminton doubles star Choong Tan Fook, with whom she has two children. She is currently coaching in a badminton facility in Guangzhou. Zhang Jiewen received an award during a ceremony to mark her retirement with five other teammates from the Chinese national badminton team on the sidelines of the China Open badminton event in Shanghai, November 23, 2008.

Achievements

Olympic Games 
Women's doubles

World Championships 
Women's doubles

World Cup 
Women's doubles

Asian Games 
Women's doubles

Mixed doubles

Asian Championships 
Women's doubles

World Junior Championships 
Girls' doubles

Asian Junior Championships 
Girls' doubles

Mixed doubles

BWF Superseries 
The BWF Superseries, which was launched on 14 December 2006 and implemented in 2007, is a series of elite badminton tournaments, sanctioned by the Badminton World Federation (BWF). BWF Superseries levels are Superseries and Superseries Premier. A season of Superseries consists of twelve tournaments around the world that have been introduced since 2011. Successful players are invited to the Superseries Finals, which are held at the end of each year.

Women's doubles

  BWF Superseries Finals tournament
  BWF Superseries Premier tournament
  BWF Superseries tournament

BWF Grand Prix 
The BWF Grand Prix had two levels, the BWF Grand Prix and Grand Prix Gold. It was a series of badminton tournaments sanctioned by the Badminton World Federation (BWF) which was held from 2007 to 2017. The World Badminton Grand Prix has been sanctioned by the International Badminton Federation from 1983 to 2006.

Women's doubles

Mixed doubles

  BWF Grand Prix Gold tournament
  BWF & IBF Grand Prix tournament

IBF International 
Women's doubles

References

External links 
 
 
 
 

1981 births
Living people
Badminton players from Guangzhou
Chinese female badminton players
Badminton players at the 2004 Summer Olympics
Badminton players at the 2008 Summer Olympics
Olympic badminton players of China
Olympic gold medalists for China
Olympic medalists in badminton
Medalists at the 2004 Summer Olympics
Badminton players at the 2002 Asian Games
Badminton players at the 2006 Asian Games
Asian Games gold medalists for China
Asian Games silver medalists for China
Asian Games bronze medalists for China
Asian Games medalists in badminton
Medalists at the 2002 Asian Games
Medalists at the 2006 Asian Games
World No. 1 badminton players